Metro Screen was a Paddington, Sydney based not-for-profit film, television and digital media training organisation. It was the NSW member of Screen Development Australia (SDA) and was located in the Paddington Town Hall, Cnr Oxford St & Oatley Rd, Paddington. Other members include Open Channel (Vic),  QPIX (Qld), Media Resource Centre (SA), Wide Angle Tasmania (Tas), and FTI (WA).

It began in 1981 and closed in December 2015 and was originally known as The Paddington Video Access Centre. During the eighties "Metro" was instrumental in developing community access to video and television production through training, productions and capital investment in equipment and facilities. In the late eighties Metro organised the community television trials and was a key organisational player in the establishment of Sydney's community television station Television Sydney. It received funding from Screen NSW.

Films recently developed by Metro Screen include:

References

External links
 https://web.archive.org/web/20111109061308/http://www.metroscreen.org.au/

Film schools in Australia